This is a list of current and planned commercial space stations.

Axiom Segment/Axiom Space Station
Axiom Orbital Segment or Axiom Segment are the planned components of the International Space Station (ISS) designed by Axiom Space for commercial space activities and space tourism uses. Axiom Space gained initial NASA approval for the venture in January 2020. This orbital segment is planned to be separated from the ISS to become a separate space station, Axiom Station. It is unsure what launch vehicles will be used to launch these modules.

Up to three Axiom modules could attach to the International Space Station. The first module could be launched in 2024 and would dock to the forward port of Harmony, requiring relocation of Pressurized Mating Adapter (PMA-2) to any other ports on ISS like Harmony nadir. Axiom Space plans to attach up to two additional modules to its first core module, and send private astronauts to inhabit the modules.

Axiom renderings illustrate how the three modules might attach to the ISS as they are berthed and relocated by the Mobile Servicing System using Canadarm2. Canadarm2 might also continue its operations on the Axiom Space Station after the retirement of ISS in late 2020s.

Northrop Grumman 
In December 2021, Northrop Grumman signed a Space Act Agreement with NASA under the Commercial Low-Earth Orbit Development program for $125.6 million to design a commercial free-flying space station in low Earth orbit (LEO). Northrop Grumman has a web page describing their "vision for space-as-a-service" which "focuses on delivering an accessible, full-service commercial space station in Low-Earth Orbit (LEO) that will continue the work of the International Space Station (ISS), while expanding across multiple markets to provide optimized and tailored support for a new commercial economy."  Northrop Grumman is partnering with Rhodium Scientific on bio-tech and bio-pharma research in low-earth orbit.

Orbital Reef 
On October 25, 2021, Blue Origin announced that together with Sierra Space it would build a 'Mixed-use space business park' in LEO called Orbital Reef, to 'open multiple new markets in space, [and] provide anyone with the opportunity to establish their own address on orbit. [..it] will offer research, industrial, international, and commercial customers the cost competitive end-to-end services they need including space transportation and logistics, space habitation, equipment accommodation, and operations including onboard crew. The station will start operating in the second half of this decade..' Further partners are Boeing, Redwire Space, Genesis Engineering Solutions, and Arizona State University.

Starlab
Starlab is the name given to the planned LEO space station designed by Nanoracks for commercial space activities uses. The company released preliminary plans in October 2021. The main structure of Starlab consists of a large inflatable habitat to be built by Lockheed Martin and a metallic docking node. The station is being designed to support 4 persons in 340 m3 of volume. The station also features a 60 kW power and propulsion element, a large robotic arm for servicing cargo and external payloads. The station is supposed to be operational in 2027. The company has partnered with other companies to realise the project:
 Nanoracks: Nanoracks owns and operates Starlab and GWC Science Park.
 Voyager Space: Voyager, the majority stakeholder in Nanoracks;
 Lockheed Martin: Lockheed Martin builds spacecraft systems. The company serves as the technical integrator for Starlab and will develop Starlab's inflatable habitat module.  After launch, Lockheed Martin will operate the system under Nanoracks' leadership.

See also
Commercial astronaut
Space tourism

References 

Space stations
Commercial space stations